The South African Federation of Trade Unions (SAFTU) is a trade union federation in South Africa. It was founded in 2017, and is the second largest of the country’s main trade union confederations, with 21 affiliated trade unions organising 800,000 workers.

Affiliates

Current affiliates
The following unions were affiliated in 2021:

Former affiliates

References

2017 establishments in South Africa
National trade union centres of South Africa
Trade unions established in 2017